James Densley (born April 13, 1982) is a British-American sociologist and Professor of Criminal Justice at Metropolitan State University. He is best known as co-founder of The Violence Project and as co-author of the bestselling book, The Violence Project: How To Stop a Mass Shooting Epidemic. Densley has also published extensively on street gang issues and has been described as "among the most accomplished rising leaders of modern gang research in criminology." He was one of the top 250 most cited criminologists in the world in 2019.

Densley is known for his ethnography of gang life in London, England, and his applications of economic signalling theory to gang membership. Densley's research examines group processes in gangs and compares gangs with other violent collectives such as hate groups and terror groups. He once compared the Islamic State to a “street gang on steroids”. Densley writes about the “glocalisation” of gang culture, cyber violence, and the role of rap music and social media in gang violence.

Densley is a TEDx speaker and has written for CNN, Education Week, The Guardian, Los Angeles Times, New York Times, Scientific American, StarTribune, Time magazine, USA Today, The Wall Street Journal, The Washington Post, and other media on a range of public issues, including gangs and gang responses, gun violence, knife crime, drug sales, school shootings, policing, and violent extremism. His work has featured on Last Week Tonight with John Oliver and he has appeared on Andrea Mitchell Reports, BBC News, CBS This Morning, CNN Newsroom, Deadline: White House, Don Lemon Tonight, Dr. Phil, Face the Nation, Inside Edition, Morning Joe, The New Yorker Radio Hour, NBC Nightly News, NPR, PBS NewsHour, and other major news shows.

Education and early career
Densley received his B.A. in sociology with American studies from the University of Northampton in 2003.  He earned an M.S. in sociology from the University of Oxford in 2004, and then moved to New York City where he enrolled in the NYC Teaching Fellows and taught 7th and 8th grade special education at University Neighborhood Middle School in Manhattan's Lower East Side.  In New York, he earned his teacher's license and a master's degree in education from Pace University. In 2007, Densley moved back to England to complete a D.Phil. in sociology from Oxford University's Extra-Legal Governance Institute.  Densley studied under mafia scholars Diego Gambetta and Federico Varese, and his work seems to reflect his time with them from his methods, to his theory, and focus on social organizations.  Densley graduated in 2011 and was hired by Metropolitan State University that same year. He was promoted to full professor in 2019, aged just 37.

Research
The 2011 England riots occurred just weeks after Densley had finished his PhD, a study of gangs in London. After the UK Prime Minister David Cameron blamed the riots on gangs,  Densley was one of the first academics to question this logic. Densley's first book, How Gangs Work, grew out of his PhD research and reflects upon the “war on gangs” launched after the 2011 riots. The British Journal of Criminology mentions the book's “critical ethnography and first-class fieldwork”, concluding that “Densley’s work points the way to how gang research should be done in the future.”

In the book and in later research, Densley used signaling theory to make sense of how and why youth join gangs.  He found that prospective gang members signal their potential value to the gang by engaging in violent and criminal acts that are beyond the capacity of most people.  Densley also used signaling theory to advance a model of disengagement from gangs that allows ex-gang members to communicate their unobservable inner change to others and satisfy community expectations that desistance from crime is real.  For Densley, religious conversion in prison was one example of a disengagement signal.

Densley's work explores the rationality of gang behavior.  He developed an influential model of gang evolution that explains the relationship between gangs and organized crime.  He found that recreation, crime, enterprise, and governance were not static gang activities or distinct gang types, but instead sequential "actualization stages" in the lifecycle of gangs. Densley's evolutionary model was later validated by studies of gangs in London, England, and Glasgow, Scotland.

Densley also studies illicit drug dealing. In 2012, he warned about the county lines model of drug distribution in which drug‐selling gangs from the major urban areas, like London, send vulnerable youth to exploit markets in other towns and areas: “Most youngers are employed by their elders to work what was known colloquially as the ‘drugs line,’ although some are sent out ‘on assignment’ to explore ‘new markets’ in areas where they are unknown to police; notably commuter cities with vibrant nighttime economies”.  His later work looked at debt bondage and child exploitation in county lines drug dealing, and how expressive uses of social media by gang members, such as posting rap videos to YouTube, helped advance gang members’ material interests in county lines.

The Violence Project 
In 2017, Densley launched The Violence Project with psychologist Jillian Peterson of Hamline University. In their first project, Densley and Peterson partnered with the Minnetonka Police Department to develop a new mental illness crisis intervention training for law enforcement, known as The R-Model.

With funding from the National Institute of Justice, Densley and Peterson next built a database of all public mass shooters since 1966 coded according to 150 life history variables. Their research on mass shooters included in-depth analysis of K-12 school shootings and how the Columbine High School massacre became a blueprint for future massacres. Densley and Peterson are critical of active shooter drills in schools for traumatizing young children and normalizing school violence.

In a 2019 op-ed for the Los Angeles Times that went viral, The Violence Project presented a new, hopeful, framework to understand mass shootings. Based on interviews with mass shooters and people who knew them, Peterson and Densley found mass shooters had four things in common: (1) early childhood trauma; (2) an identifiable crisis point with suicidal ideation; (3) validation for their grievance, having studied past shootings to find social proof of concept; and (4) the means to carry out an attack. This conceptual framework highlights the complexity of the pathway to a mass shooting, including how each one can be “socially contagious”, but also creates a plan to prevent the next shooting.

Each one of the four themes can be addressed at the individual, institutional, and societal levels. For example, by regulating access to firearms (opportunity), slowing contagion (social proof), training in crisis intervention and suicide prevention (crisis), and strengthening the social safety net (trauma), a mass shooting can be averted. Densley and Peterson elaborate on this framework in their book, The Violence Project: How To Stop a Mass Shooting Epidemic, which "identifies 34 potential solutions" to the "uniquely American problem" of mass shootings. Their research shows mass shooters tend to communicate or "leak" intent to do harm, often as a cry for help, which means mass shootings are preventable if people learn how to respond to the warning signs.

Growing Against Violence 
Densley is a co-founder of Growing Against Violence, a London-based charity that since 2008 has delivered violence prevention programming to nearly 200,000 children and young people in hundreds of schools. Densley wrote and piloted the original curriculum and later conducted an evaluation of the program. In 2017, Densley was awarded the Prime Minister's Points of Light award for his “outstanding” volunteerism.

Selected publications 

Contesting county lines (Bristol University Press, 2023). With Robert McLean and Carlton Brick.
On gangs (Temple University Press, 2022). With Scott Decker and David Pyrooz.
Robbery in the illegal drugs trade (Bristol University Press, 2022). With Robert McLean.
The Violence Project: how to stop a mass shooting epidemic (Abrams Press, 2021). With Jillian Peterson.
Scotland's gang members: life and crime in Glasgow (Palgrave Macmillan, 2020). With Robert McLean.
County lines: criminal networks and evolving drug markets in Britain (Springer, 2019). With Robert McLean and Grace Robinson.
Minnesota’s criminal justice system (Carolina Academic Press, 2016). With Jeff Bumgarner and Susan Hilal.
How gangs work: An ethnography of youth violence (Palgrave Macmillan, 2013).

Awards
Minnesota Book Awards (General Nonfiction), 2022
Points of Light Award, 2017
National Gang Crime Research Center's Frederick Milton Thrasher Award, 2013
Densley was appointed Fellow of the Royal Society of Arts in 2014.

Popular culture
The character of Jamie Patterson in the spy novel, Jihadi Apprentice by David Bruns and J.R. Olson is based on James Densley.

References

External links
https://www.theviolenceproject.org
https://www.metrostate.edu
https://www.thersa.org/
https://scholar.google.com/citations?user=iS4HAEMAAAAJ&hl=en

1982 births
Living people
People from Leicester
Alumni of the University of Oxford
Alumni of St Antony's College, Oxford
Alumni of the University of Northampton
Pace University alumni
British sociologists
British criminologists